The red Pangani barb (Enteromius venustus) is a species of cyprinid fish.

It is found in Kenya and Tanzania.
Its natural habitats are rivers and freshwater lakes. Its status is insufficiently known.

References

Enteromius
Cyprinid fish of Africa
Fish described in 1980
Taxa named by Roland G. Bailey
Taxonomy articles created by Polbot